Lucrezia Colombotto Rosso (born 7 March 1996) is an Italian professional golfer playing on the Ladies European Tour. She competed at the 2020 Summer Olympics.

Amateur career
Colombotto Rosso played for the Italian National Team and won silver at the 2014 European Girls' Team Championship in Slovakia. In 2015, she won the Città di Milano Trophy and won both the Italian Stroke-play and Match-play Championships, the first dual female champion in 26 years.

At the end of her amateur career, she was 48th in the World Amateur Golf Ranking, 20th in the European, and 2nd in the Italian.

Professional career
Colombotto Rosso turned professional in late 2016 and joined the 2017 LET Access Series after playing in the Ladies European Tour Qualifying School in December. She played her first major at the 2019 U.S. Women's Open after she won the European qualifier at Buckinghamshire Golf Club, England.

In 2019, Colombotto Rosso was runner-up at the WPGA International Challenge in England, one stroke behind Manon De Roey and again at the Ribeira Sacra Patrimonio de la Humanidad International Ladies Open in Spain, two strokes behind Rachael Goodall of England. She finished third in the 2019 LET Access Series Ranking, earning a 2020 LET card.               

Colombotto Rosso finished her rookie LET season in 24th place on the 2020 Costa del Sol Order of Merit, with at top finish of 4th at the Tipsport Czech Ladies Open, where she shot a career-low 66 in the opening round.

In June 2021, she qualified for the 2020 Olympics, taking place in Tokyo, Japan, in August 2021, along with Giulia Molinaro.

Amateur wins
2012 GGL International Junior Open
2013 Sanremo Trophy, Pallavicino Trophy
2015 Italian Ladies Stroke Play Championship - Isa Goldschmid Trophy, Città di Milano Trofeo Gianni Albertinim, Italian Ladies Match Play - Giuseppe Silva Trophy

Source:

Professional wins

LET Access Series wins (1)

Team appearances
Amateur
European Girls' Team Championship (representing Italy): 2013, 2014
European Ladies' Team Championship (representing Italy): 2015, 2016
Patsy Hankins Trophy (representing Europe): 2016

Source:

References

External links

Italian female golfers
Ladies European Tour golfers
Olympic golfers of Italy
Golfers at the 2020 Summer Olympics
Sportspeople from Turin
1996 births
Living people